Thielenbruch station is a terminal and former depot of Cologne Stadtbahn located in the quarter of Dellbrück in Cologne. It is the northern terminus of Stadtbahn lines 3 and 18.

Terminal 
The former depot Thielenbruch for the tram network consisted of one hall from 1906 and another from 1926. The older hall was rebuilt to the terminal of the Stadtbahn lines. There are today two platforms of which each serve two tracks, so the station totally offers four tracks.

Museum 

Since 1997, the hall from 1926 is used as a transport museum to document the development of tramways and Stadtbahn in the Cologne region. Its collection contains several tram cars that were used by the Cologne transport authority (Kölner Verkehrsbetriebe, KVB), among them a horse-drawn tram, an "Achtachser" (lit. eight-axler), an articulated tram with eight axles, which was the last classical tram of Cologne, yet a very common type as it was used almost throughout the entire network, as well as the prototype of the Stadtbahn car B.

See also  
 List of Cologne KVB stations

External links 
 http://www.kvb-koeln.de/german/unternehmen/museum/index.html – Information of Cologne transport authority about the museum (German)
 http://www.hsk-koeln.de/german/index.html – Homepage of the association for historic trams in Cologne (which operates the museum) (German)

References 

Cologne KVB stations
Cologne-Bonn Stadtbahn stations
Railway stations in Germany opened in 1995